The 1977 Wendy's Tennis Classic, also known as the Buckeye Championships, was a men's tennis tournament played on outdoor clay courts at the Muirfield Village in Dublin, a suburb of Columbus, Ohio in the United States that was part of the Four Star category of the 1977 Grand Prix circuit. It was the eight edition of the tournament and was held  from August 8 through August 15, 1977. First-seeded Guillermo Vilas won the singles title and earned $20,000 first-prize money.

Finals

Singles
 Guillermo Vilas defeated  Brian Gottfried 6–2, 6–1
 It was Vilas' 9th singles title of the year and 28th of his career.

Doubles
 Bob Lutz /  Stan Smith defeated  Peter Fleming /  Gene Mayer 4–6, 7–5, 6–2

References

External links
 ITF tournament edition details

Buckeye Tennis Championships
Buckeye Tennis Championships
Buckeye Tennis Championships
Buckeye Tennis Championships